Ambrosio Aimar (15 July 1923 – 12 September 2007) was an Argentine cyclist. He competed in the team pursuit event at the 1948 Summer Olympics.

References

External links
 

1923 births
2007 deaths
Argentine male cyclists
Olympic cyclists of Argentina
Cyclists at the 1948 Summer Olympics